Isokyrö is a municipality of Finland. It is located in the South Ostrobothnia region,  from Vaasa.

In the name of the municipality, "iso" means big; "kyrö", on the other hand, is a Tavastian dialect and means a quarry, rocky or rugged terrain for hiding. The municipality is unilingually Finnish.

According to Traficom, Isokyrö is the most motorized municipality in Finland with 718 cars per thousand inhabitants.

Geography

Isonkyrö's neighboring municipalities are Ilmajoki, Kauhava, Laihia, Seinäjoki, Vaasa and Vörå.

Localities:
 Tuurala

Notable people 
 Matti Haapoja (1845–1895), serial killer
 Kustaa Killinen (1849–1922), schoolteacher, writer and politician
 Matti Pohto (1817–1857), bookbinder and book collector
 Eino S. Repo (1919–2002), journalist and politician
 Ilmari Turja (1901–1998), journalist, playwright and lawyer
 Marjo Yli-Kiikka (born 1978), sports shooter

See also 
 Levänluhta
 Isokyrö railway station
 Tervajoki railway station
 Battle of Napue

References

External links 

 Municipality of Isokyrö – Official website

Isokyrö
Populated places established in 1785